Spurius Postumius Albinus Magnus was a politician of ancient Rome, of patrician rank, during the 2nd century BC.  He was consul in 148 BC, in which year a great fire happened at Rome.  It is this Spurius Albinus of whom Cicero speaks in the Brutus, and says that there were many orations of his.

Children 

Based on their filiations, he was probably the father of the consuls Spurius Postumius Albinus and Aulus Postumius Albinus.

See also 
 Postumia gens

References 

2nd-century BC Roman consuls
Spurius, Magnus